Cinco Vodka is produced in San Antonio, Texas. The company was founded by Richard "Trey" Azar III. The vodka is made from Idaho-sourced wheat and water drawn from the Edwards Aquifer. It is distilled in the distillery's 530-gallon hand-hammered copper kettle.  Cinco Vodka's unique flavor profile is derived from a more labor-intensive and slower custom method which allows them to not rely on charcoal filtration or sugar addition processes.

References
Official Website, http://thecincovodka.com/

American vodkas
Economy of San Antonio